Johann Natterer (9 November 1787 – 17 June 1843) was an Austrian naturalist and explorer.

Family and early life

Johann Natterer was born on 9 November 1787, the son of the animal-zoologist Joseph Natterer Sr. and Maria Anna Theresia Schober (his mother), the daughter of a master baker from Laxenburg. He had a brother (Joseph Natterer, 1776–1852). Joseph Natterer Sr. was the last mounted falconer of Austria. When Emperor Franz I dissolved the falconry (Falknerei) in Laxenburg, he bought the collection of Joseph Natterer Sr. This contained numerous domestic birds, mammals, and insects, and Franz I assigned it the further support and the development of the collection.

The collection was brought in 1794 to Vienna and incorporated in the Tiercabinet with the k.k physical-astronomical as well as the Kunstcabinet. The collection was soon made accessible to the public, however without scientific or didactic value. Joseph Natterer Sr. introduced both his sons to the collection and brought to the art of preparing Ausbalgens and chase. His oldest son, Joseph, began his career as a volunteer aide and terminated as first  Kustos, Johann became in 1808 freiwilliger coworkers.

Johann Natterer initially attended a Piarist school; however, in 1794, he transferred to a normal school and completed high school (gymnasium) there. From 1802 to 1803, Johann Natterer attended the material academy and heard scientific lectures at the university.

Expeditions
In 1817, Emperor Franz I financed an expedition to Brazil on the occasion of the wedding of his daughter Archduchess Leopoldina to the Portuguese crown prince, Dom Pedro of Alcantara (who was later to become Emperor of Brazil). Natterer was the zoologist on the expedition and was accompanied by other naturalists including Johann Baptist von Spix and Carl Friedrich Philipp von Martius. Johann Natterer remained in South America for 18 years, until 1835, returning to Vienna with a large collection of specimens, including new species such as the South American lungfish, which he gave to the Imperial Natural-Science Cabinet (K.k. Naturaliencabinet), the predecessor of the Naturhistorisches Museum.

Field notes
Natterer did not publish an account of his travels, and his notebooks and diary were destroyed in the Hofburg fire of 1848 during the Vienna Revolution; however, his specimen collections of 60,000 insects were a part of the "Brazilian museum" in the "Harrach' house" and escaped the fire.

Natterer also collected word lists of dozens of indigenous South American languages, including of various Arawakan, Tupian, Bororoan, and other languages. The lists are mostly still in unpublished manuscripts that are currently still being digitized.

Species named after Natterer
A number of animals are named after Johann Natterer, including Natterer's slaty antshrike and Natterer's bat. Three species of reptiles are named in his honor: Lystrophis nattereri, Philodryas nattereri, and Tropiocolotes nattereri.

The fish Copella nattereri Steindachner, 1876 is named after him.

The catfish Corydoras nattereri Steindachner, 1876 is named after him.

The South American fish Leporinus nattereri Steindachner 1876.

Further reading
"Johann Natterer," in Tom Taylor and Michael Taylor, Aves: A Survey of the Literature of Neotropical Ornithology, Baton Rouge: Louisiana State University Libraries, 2011.

References

1787 births
1843 deaths
Austrian biologists
Austrian explorers
Austrian naturalists